Fozzy is an American heavy metal group. 

It may also refer to:

Fozzy, nickname for Craig Foster, Australian football commentator and human rights advocate
Fozzy (album), album by the band Fozzy
Fozzy Group, Ukrainian group of retail companies 
Fozzy Whittaker, American football player

See also

Fozzie Bear, a Muppet character